West Chandler Pond is a  pond in Pembroke, Massachusetts. The pond is located west of Upper Chandler Pond and northwest of Pembroke's easternmost Town Forest. The pond is hydrologically associated with a cranberry bog located to the southeast. An unnamed stream that runs through the cranberry bog and ultimately leads to Pine Brook, a tributary of the Jones River, is the outflow of the pond.

External links
Environmental Protection Agency
South Shore Coastal Watersheds - Lake Assessments

Ponds of Plymouth County, Massachusetts
Pembroke, Massachusetts
Ponds of Massachusetts